The following is a list of 2023 box office number-one films in South Korea by week. When the number-one film in gross is not the same as the number-one film in admissions, both are listed.

Highest-grossing films

See also
 List of South Korean films of 2023
 List of 2022 box office number-one films in South Korea
 2023 in South Korea

References

External links

2023
South Korea